The 1992 Philadelphia Phillies season was a season in Major League Baseball. The Phillies finished sixth in the National League East with a record of 70 wins and 92 losses.

Offseason
 December 8, 1991: Von Hayes was traded by the Phillies to the California Angels for Rubén Amaro, Jr. and Kyle Abbott.
 December 9, 1991: Danny Cox was signed as a free agent by the Phillies.
 December 10, 1991: Mariano Duncan was signed as a free agent by the Phillies.
 December 11, 1991: Bruce Ruffin was traded by the Phillies to the Milwaukee Brewers for Dale Sveum.
 January 8, 1992: The Phillies traded a player to be named later to the New York Yankees for Darrin Chapin. The Phillies completed the deal by sending Charlie Hayes to the Yankees on February 19.
 January 8, 1992: Rick Schu was signed as a free agent by the Phillies.

Regular season
On September 20, Mickey Morandini executed an unassisted triple play in the sixth inning. He caught a line drive, touched second base and tagged the runner coming from first base.

Notable transactions
 April 2, 1992: Jason Grimsley was traded by the Phillies to the Houston Astros for Curt Schilling.
 April 5, 1992: Steve Lake was signed as a free agent by the Phillies.
 June 1, 1992: Bobby Estalella was drafted by the Phillies in the 23rd round of the 1992 Major League Baseball draft. Player signed May 9, 1993.
 June 7, 1992: Danny Cox was released by the Phillies.
 August 10, 1992: Dale Sveum was traded by the Phillies to the Chicago White Sox for Keith Shepherd.
 August 11, 1992: Steve Scarsone was traded by the Phillies to the Baltimore Orioles for Juan Bell.

Season standings

Record vs. opponents

1992 Game Log

|- style="background:#fbb"
| 1 || April 7 || Cubs || 3–4 || Greg Maddux (1–0) || Terry Mulholland (0–1) || Chuck McElroy (1) || 60,431 || 0–1
|- style="background:#bfb"
| 2 || April 8 || Cubs || 11–3 || Tommy Greene (1–0) || Danny Jackson (0–1) || None || 16,328 || 1–1
|- style="background:#bfb"
| 3 || April 9 || Cubs || 7–1 || Danny Cox (1–0) || Mike Morgan (0–1) || None || 14,149 || 2–1
|- style="background:#fbb"
| 4 || April 10 || Pirates || 2–3 || Randy Tomlin (1–0) || Kyle Abbott (0–1) || Stan Belinda (2) || 21,019 || 2–2
|- style="background:#bfb"
| 5 || April 11 || Pirates || 7–4 || Andy Ashby (1–0) || Doug Drabek (1–1) || None || 24,967 || 3–2
|- style="background:#fbb"
| 6 || April 12 || Pirates || 1–6 || Zane Smith (2–0) || Terry Mulholland (0–2) || None || 32,624 || 3–3
|- style="background:#bfb"
| 7 || April 13 || @ Mets || 3–2 || Curt Schilling (1–0) || Sid Fernandez (0–2) || Mitch Williams (1) || 14,810 || 4–3
|- style="background:#fbb"
| 8 || April 14 || @ Mets || 5–8 || John Franco (1–0) || Cliff Brantley (0–1) || None || 15,274 || 4–4
|- style="background:#fbb"
| 9 || April 15 || @ Mets || 2–7 || Dwight Gooden (1–1) || Kyle Abbott (0–2) || None || 17,448 || 4–5
|- style="background:#fbb"
| 10 || April 17 || @ Pirates || 4–7 || Doug Drabek (2–1) || Barry Jones (0–1) || Stan Belinda (3) || 16,417 || 4–6
|- style="background:#fbb"
| 11 || April 18 || @ Pirates || 2–9 || Zane Smith (3–0) || Tommy Greene (1–1) || None || 23,411 || 4–7
|- style="background:#fbb"
| 12 || April 19 || @ Pirates || 0–11 || Bob Patterson (1–0) || Danny Cox (1–1) || None || 11,812 || 4–8
|- style="background:#fbb"
| 13 || April 20 || @ Cubs || 3–8 || Greg Maddux (3–0) || Kyle Abbott (0–3) || None || 23,515 || 4–9
|- style="background:#bfb"
| 14 || April 21 || @ Cubs || 7–5 (10) || Mitch Williams (1–0) || Heathcliff Slocumb (0–1) || Curt Schilling (1) || 8,886 || 5–9
|- style="background:#fbb"
| 15 || April 22 || @ Cubs || 5–9 || Shawn Boskie (3–0) || Terry Mulholland (0–3) || None || 8,167 || 5–10
|- style="background:#bfb"
| 16 || April 23 || @ Cubs || 8–2 || Tommy Greene (2–1) || Frank Castillo (0–1) || None || 9,086 || 6–10
|- style="background:#bfb"
| 17 || April 24 || Mets || 4–3 || Mitch Williams (2–0) || Wally Whitehurst (0–1) || None || 25,482 || 7–10
|- style="background:#fbb"
| 18 || April 25 || Mets || 2–3 || Sid Fernandez (1–2) || Kyle Abbott (0–4) || John Franco (3) || 29,374 || 7–11
|- style="background:#bfb"
| 19 || April 26 || Mets || 5–4 || Barry Jones (1–1) || Wally Whitehurst (0–2) || Mitch Williams (2) || 44,194 || 8–11
|- style="background:#bfb"
| 20 || April 27 || @ Padres || 12–9 || Curt Schilling (2–0) || Bruce Hurst (1–2) || Mitch Williams (3) || 11,998 || 9–11
|- style="background:#fbb"
| 21 || April 28 || @ Padres || 6–7 || Pat Clements (1–0) || Curt Schilling (2–1) || None || 10,181 || 9–12
|- style="background:#bfb"
| 22 || April 29 || @ Dodgers || 7–3 || Danny Cox (2–1) || Orel Hershiser (2–2) || None || 36,639 || 10–12
|- style="background:#bbb"
| – || April 30 || @ Dodgers || colspan=6 | Postponed (Rodney King riots); Makeup: July 3 as a traditional double-header
|-

|- style="background:#bbb"
| – || May 1 || @ Giants || colspan=6 | Postponed (Rodney King riots); Makeup: July 7 as a traditional double-header
|- style="background:#fbb"
| 23 || May 2 || @ Giants || 1–2 || Bill Swift (5–0) || Kyle Abbott (0–5) || Dave Righetti (1) || 12,157 || 10–13
|- style="background:#bfb"
| 24 || May 3 || @ Giants || 12–3 || Cliff Brantley (1–1) || Trevor Wilson (1–2) || Curt Schilling (2) || 27,515 || 11–13
|- style="background:#bfb"
| 25 || May 5 || Dodgers || 6–2 || Terry Mulholland (1–3) || Tom Candiotti (3–1) || None || 15,654 || 12–13
|- style="background:#fbb"
| 26 || May 6 || Dodgers || 1–3 || Ramón Martínez (1–1) || Danny Cox (2–2) || Roger McDowell (3) || 21,679 || 12–14
|- style="background:#fbb"
| 27 || May 8 || Padres || 5–6 || José Meléndez (4–0) || Curt Schilling (2–2) || Randy Myers (7) || 8,798 || 12–15
|- style="background:#fbb"
| 28 || May 9 || Padres || 1–5 || Craig Lefferts (3–2) || Cliff Brantley (1–2) || Randy Myers (8) || 23,070 || 12–16
|- style="background:#bfb"
| 29 || May 10 || Padres || 9–3 || Terry Mulholland (2–3) || Greg W. Harris (1–3) || None ||  || 13–16
|- style="background:#fbb"
| 30 || May 11 || Giants || 7–8 (10) || Dave Burba (2–3) || Mitch Williams (2–1) || None || 15,905 || 13–17
|- style="background:#fbb"
| 31 || May 12 || Giants || 5–7 || Bryan Hickerson (2–1) || Barry Jones (1–2) || Mike Jackson (1) || 16,247 || 13–18
|- style="background:#fbb"
| 32 || May 13 || Giants || 3–5 || Trevor Wilson (3–2) || Kyle Abbott (0–6) || Jeff Brantley (3) || 21,211 || 13–19
|- style="background:#bfb"
| 33 || May 15 || @ Reds || 8–0 || Terry Mulholland (3–3) || Tom Browning (3–3) || None || 32,819 || 14–19
|- style="background:#fbb"
| 34 || May 16 || @ Reds || 5–6 || Tim Belcher (3–4) || Wally Ritchie (0–1) || Rob Dibble (5) || 42,382 || 14–20
|- style="background:#bfb"
| 35 || May 17 || @ Reds || 5–4 || Mike Hartley (1–0) || Rob Dibble (0–1) || Mitch Williams (4) || 29,783 || 15–20
|- style="background:#fbb"
| 36 || May 18 || Astros || 2–4 || Jimmy Jones (1–0) || Kyle Abbott (0–7) || Joe Boever (1) || 17,309 || 15–21
|- style="background:#bfb"
| 37 || May 19 || Astros || 4–3 || Curt Schilling (3–2) || Butch Henry (0–4) || Mitch Williams (5) || 15,299 || 16–21
|- style="background:#bfb"
| 38 || May 20 || Astros || 2–1 || Terry Mulholland (4–3) || Darryl Kile (2–5) || Mitch Williams (6) || 16,048 || 17–21
|- style="background:#bbb"
| – || May 21 || Reds || colspan=6 | Postponed (rain); Makeup: August 18 as a traditional double-header
|- style="background:#bfb"
| 39 || May 22 || Reds || 8–2 || Cliff Brantley (2–2) || Tim Belcher (3–5) || None || 22,028 || 18–21
|- style="background:#fbb"
| 40 || May 23 || Reds || 0–10 || Greg Swindell (4–2) || Brad Brink (0–1) || None || 26,332 || 18–22
|- style="background:#fbb"
| 41 || May 24 || Reds || 3–8 || José Rijo (1–3) || Curt Schilling (3–3) || None || 30,954 || 18–23
|- style="background:#bfb"
| 42 || May 25 || Braves || 4–1 || Terry Mulholland (5–3) || Steve Avery (2–5) || Mitch Williams (7) || 18,343 || 19–23
|- style="background:#bfb"
| 43 || May 26 || Braves || 5–2 || Don Robinson (2–0) || Mike Bielecki (1–3) || Mitch Williams (8) || 11,295 || 20–23
|- style="background:#fbb"
| 44 || May 27 || Braves || 3–9 || Tom Glavine (7–3) || Cliff Brantley (2–3) || None || 23,695 || 20–24
|- style="background:#bfb"
| 45 || May 29 || @ Astros || 2–1 (12) || Barry Jones (2–2) || Al Osuna (3–3) || None || 10,815 || 21–24
|- style="background:#fbb"
| 46 || May 30 || @ Astros || 4–5 || Jimmy Jones (2–0) || Terry Mulholland (5–4) || Doug Jones (12) || 16,046 || 21–25
|- style="background:#bfb"
| 47 || May 31 || @ Astros || 6–3 (11) || Barry Jones (3–2) || Rob Murphy (0–1) || Wally Ritchie (1) || 14,846 || 22–25
|-

|- style="background:#fbb"
| 48 || June 1 || @ Braves || 6–7 || Tom Glavine (8–3) || Cliff Brantley (2–4) || Mark Wohlers (1) || 25,647 || 22–26
|- style="background:#fbb"
| 49 || June 2 || @ Braves || 3–5 || Mike Stanton (1–2) || Mitch Williams (2–2) || None || 27,855 || 22–27
|- style="background:#bfb"
| 50 || June 3 || @ Braves || 4–1 || Curt Schilling (4–3) || John Smoltz (5–5) || Mitch Williams (9) || 19,357 || 23–27
|- style="background:#bfb"
| 51 || June 5 || Cardinals || 7–5 || Barry Jones (4–2) || Todd Worrell (2–2) || Mitch Williams (10) || 12,128 || 24–27
|- style="background:#bfb"
| 52 || June 6 || Cardinals || 7–5 || Mike Hartley (2–0) || Bob McClure (1–1) || Mitch Williams (11) || 28,257 || 25–27
|- style="background:#fbb"
| 53 || June 7 || Cardinals || 4–5 || Todd Worrell (3–2) || Bob Ayrault (0–1) || Lee Smith (15) || 24,512 || 25–28
|- style="background:#bfb"
| 54 || June 8 || Pirates || 7–0 || Curt Schilling (5–3) || Vicente Palacios (3–1) || None || 21,040 || 26–28
|- style="background:#fbb"
| 55 || June 9 || Pirates || 3–5 || Doug Drabek (5–4) || Mike Hartley (2–1) || Denny Neagle (1) || 29,138 || 26–29
|- style="background:#fbb"
| 56 || June 10 || Pirates || 1–2 (12) || Bob Patterson (3–0) || Barry Jones (4–3) || Roger Mason (6) || 25,112 || 26–30
|- style="background:#bfb"
| 57 || June 12 || @ Cardinals || 8–5 || Wally Ritchie (1–1) || Donovan Osborne (5–3) || Mitch Williams (12) || 35,719 || 27–30
|- style="background:#fbb"
| 58 || June 13 || @ Cardinals || 1–4 || Omar Olivares (3–3) || Curt Schilling (5–4) || Lee Smith (16) || 39,477 || 27–31
|- style="background:#fbb"
| 59 || June 14 || @ Cardinals || 2–5 || Rhéal Cormier (1–5) || Brad Brink (0–2) || Lee Smith (17) || 40,949 || 27–32
|- style="background:#bfb"
| 60 || June 15 || @ Pirates || 4–1 || Terry Mulholland (6–4) || Zane Smith (5–5) || None || 23,581 || 28–32
|- style="background:#fbb"
| 61 || June 16 || @ Pirates || 5–6 (12) || Bob Patterson (4–0) || Cliff Brantley (2–5) || None || 18,548 || 28–33
|- style="background:#fbb"
| 62 || June 17 || @ Pirates || 2–8 || Randy Tomlin (9–3) || Don Robinson (2–1) || None || 24,854 || 28–34
|- style="background:#bfb"
| 63 || June 18 || Cubs || 4–3 || Mike Hartley (3–1) || Bob Scanlan (2–4) || Mitch Williams (13) || 32,860 || 29–34
|- style="background:#fbb"
| 64 || June 19 || Cubs || 2–5 || Danny Jackson (3–7) || Brad Brink (0–3) || Jim Bullinger (6) || 20,732 || 29–35
|- style="background:#bfb"
| 65 || June 20 || Cubs || 4–1 || Terry Mulholland (7–4) || Greg Maddux (7–7) || Mitch Williams (14) || 35,261 || 30–35
|- style="background:#fbb"
| 66 || June 21 || Cubs || 2–5 || Mike Morgan (6–2) || Kyle Abbott (0–8) || Paul Assenmacher (3) || 53,872 || 30–36
|- style="background:#bfb"
| 67 || June 22 || @ Expos || 5–3 || Pat Combs (1–0) || Brian Barnes (0–1) || Mitch Williams (15) || 15,157 || 31–36
|- style="background:#bfb"
| 68 || June 23 || @ Expos || 5–0 || Curt Schilling (6–4) || Chris Nabholz (5–6) || None || 30,313 || 32–36
|- style="background:#fbb"
| 69 || June 24 || @ Expos || 1–8 || Ken Hill (7–4) || Mickey Weston (0–1) || None || 17,422 || 32–37
|- style="background:#fbb"
| 70 || June 26 || @ Cubs || 0–3 || Mike Morgan (7–2) || Kyle Abbott (0–9) || Jim Bullinger (7) || 32,896 || 32–38
|- style="background:#bfb"
| 71 || June 27 || @ Cubs || 5–4 || Mike Hartley (4–1) || Chuck McElroy (3–4) || Mitch Williams (16) || 35,309 || 33–38
|- style="background:#fbb"
| 72 || June 28 || @ Cubs || 3–5 || Frank Castillo (6–6) || Curt Schilling (6–5) || Paul Assenmacher (4) || 32,418 || 33–39
|- style="background:#bfb"
| 73 || June 29 || Expos || 5–4 || Terry Mulholland (8–4) || Jeff Fassero (3–4) || Mitch Williams (17) || 27,426 || 34–39
|- style="background:#fbb"
| 74 || June 30 || Expos || 2–7 || Ken Hill (8–4) || Mike Williams (0–1) || None || 22,282 || 34–40
|-

|- style="background:#fbb"
| 75 || July 1 || Expos || 3–6 || Dennis Martínez (9–6) || Kyle Abbott (0–10) || John Wetteland (13) || 41,222 || 34–41
|- style="background:#fbb"
| 76 || July 2 || @ Dodgers || 4–9 || Kevin Gross (4–8) || Pat Combs (1–1) || None || 46,026 || 34–42
|- style="background:#fbb"
| 77 || July 3 (1) || @ Dodgers || 1–5 || Bob Ojeda (5–4) || Curt Schilling (6–6) || None || see 2nd game || 34–43
|- style="background:#fbb"
| 78 || July 3 (2) || @ Dodgers || 0–2 || Pedro Astacio (1–0) || Don Robinson (2–2) || None || 34,713 || 34–44
|- style="background:#bfb"
| 79 || July 4 || @ Dodgers || 3–2 || Terry Mulholland (9–4) || Tom Candiotti (6–7) || None || 44,418 || 35–44
|- style="background:#bfb"
| 80 || July 5 || @ Dodgers || 9–3 || Mike Williams (1–1) || Ramón Martínez (4–6) || None || 31,024 || 36–44
|- style="background:#fbb"
| 81 || July 6 || @ Giants || 2–4 || Bud Black (6–2) || Kyle Abbott (0–11) || Rod Beck (6) || 8,548 || 36–45
|- style="background:#fbb"
| 82 || July 7 (1) || @ Giants || 7–8 || Bryan Hickerson (3–1) || Mike Hartley (4–2) || Rod Beck (7) || see 2nd game || 36–46
|- style="background:#fbb"
| 83 || July 7 (2) || @ Giants || 6–10 || Jim Pena (1–0) || Don Robinson (2–3) || None || 13,571 || 36–47
|- style="background:#fbb"
| 84 || July 8 || @ Giants || 3–4 || Mike Jackson (4–2) || Mike Hartley (4–3) || Rod Beck (8) || 14,922 || 36–48
|- style="background:#fbb"
| 85 || July 9 || @ Padres || 1–3 || Jim Deshaies (1–0) || Terry Mulholland (9–5) || Randy Myers (14) || 17,528 || 36–49
|- style="background:#fbb"
| 86 || July 10 || @ Padres || 7–8 || Rich Rodriguez (4–2) || Barry Jones (4–4) || Randy Myers (15) || 35,376 || 36–50
|- style="background:#fbb"
| 87 || July 11 || @ Padres || 2–3 (11) || Tim Scott (2–1) || Mike Hartley (4–4) || None || 11,777 || 36–51
|- style="background:#fbb"
| 88 || July 12 || @ Padres || 2–8 || Andy Benes (7–7) || Don Robinson (2–4) || None || 21,803 || 36–52
|- style="background:#bbcaff;"
| – || July 14 ||colspan="7" |1992 Major League Baseball All-Star Game at Jack Murphy Stadium in San Diego
|- style="background:#fbb"
| 89 || July 16 || Dodgers || 5–7 || Tom Candiotti (8–8) || Terry Mulholland (9–6) || Jim Gott (4) || 34,566 || 36–53
|- style="background:#bfb"
| 90 || July 17 || Dodgers || 11–3 || Curt Schilling (7–6) || Orel Hershiser (7–8) || None || 50,606 || 37–53
|- style="background:#bfb"
| 91 || July 18 || Dodgers || 14–3 || Kyle Abbott (1–11) || Ramón Martínez (5–7) || None || 33,892 || 38–53
|- style="background:#bfb"
| 92 || July 19 || Dodgers || 6–5 || Wally Ritchie (2–1) || Jay Howell (0–1) || Mitch Williams (18) || 33,215 || 39–53
|- style="background:#fbb"
| 93 || July 20 || Padres || 1–2 || Rich Rodriguez (5–2) || Barry Jones (4–5) || Randy Myers (16) || 20,795 || 39–54
|- style="background:#fbb"
| 94 || July 21 || Padres || 3–4 || Bruce Hurst (9–6) || Terry Mulholland (9–7) || Randy Myers (17) || 19,829 || 39–55
|- style="background:#bfb"
| 95 || July 22 || Padres || 4–0 || Curt Schilling (8–6) || Andy Benes (7–9) || None || 26,062 || 40–55
|- style="background:#bfb"
| 96 || July 24 || Giants || 8–4 || Barry Jones (5–5) || Mike Jackson (4–3) || Mitch Williams (19) || 20,580 || 41–55
|- style="background:#fbb"
| 97 || July 25 || Giants || 2–6 (10) || Bryan Hickerson (4–1) || Mitch Williams (2–3) || None || 27,680 || 41–56
|- style="background:#bfb"
| 98 || July 26 || Giants || 7–2 || Terry Mulholland (10–7) || Pat Rapp (0–2) || None || 27,370 || 42–56
|- style="background:#bfb"
| 99 || July 27 || Mets || 5–0 || Curt Schilling (9–6) || Bret Saberhagen (3–3) || None || 29,138 || 43–56
|- style="background:#fbb"
| 100 || July 28 || Mets || 6–8 || David Cone (12–4) || Barry Jones (5–6) || Anthony Young (7) || 32,872 || 43–57
|- style="background:#bfb"
| 101 || July 29 || Mets || 6–3 || Mitch Williams (3–3) || Jeff Innis (5–7) || None || 39,691 || 44–57
|- style="background:#fbb"
| 102 || July 30 || @ Expos || 2–7 || Mark Gardner (10–8) || Greg Mathews (0–1) || None || 28,106 || 44–58
|- style="background:#bfb"
| 103 || July 31 || @ Expos || 2–0 || Terry Mulholland (11–7) || Brian Barnes (2–3) || None || 30,470 || 45–58
|-

|- style="background:#bfb"
| 104 || August 1 || @ Expos || 4–2 || Curt Schilling (10–6) || Ken Hill (12–5) || Mitch Williams (20) || 30,511 || 46–58
|- style="background:#fbb"
| 105 || August 2 || @ Expos || 0–1 || Chris Nabholz (7–7) || Ben Rivera (0–2) || John Wetteland (23) || 28,645 || 46–59
|- style="background:#fbb"
| 106 || August 3 || @ Cardinals || 1–2 || Bob Tewksbury (11–4) || Kyle Abbott (1–12) || Lee Smith (25) || 25,092 || 46–60
|- style="background:#fbb"
| 107 || August 4 || @ Cardinals || 5–9 || Bob McClure (2–2) || Mitch Williams (3–4) || None || 24,357 || 46–61
|- style="background:#fbb"
| 108 || August 5 || @ Cardinals || 4–5 || Donovan Osborne (8–6) || Bob Ayrault (0–2) || Lee Smith (26) || 27,396 || 46–62
|- style="background:#fbb"
| 109 || August 6 || Expos || 4–7 || Ken Hill (13–5) || Curt Schilling (10–7) || John Wetteland (26) || 18,848 || 46–63
|- style="background:#bfb"
| 110 || August 7 || Expos || 3–1 || Ben Rivera (1–2) || Chris Nabholz (7–8) || Mitch Williams (21) || 22,673 || 47–63
|- style="background:#fbb"
| 111 || August 8 || Expos || 1–6 || Dennis Martínez (12–10) || Kyle Abbott (1–13) || None || 26,338 || 47–64
|- style="background:#fbb"
| 112 || August 9 || Expos || 2–6 || Mark Gardner (11–8) || Greg Mathews (0–2) || Mel Rojas (8) || 25,683 || 47–65
|- style="background:#bbb"
| – || August 10 || Cardinals || colspan=6 | Postponed (rain); Makeup: September 26 as a traditional double-header
|- style="background:#fbb"
| 113 || August 11 || Cardinals || 6–7 || Todd Worrell (4–3) || Mitch Williams (3–5) || Lee Smith (27) || 20,825 || 47–66
|- style="background:#fbb"
| 114 || August 12 || Cardinals || 2–3 (10) || Todd Worrell (5–3) || Mitch Williams (3–6) || Lee Smith (28) || 19,807 || 47–67
|- style="background:#bfb"
| 115 || August 14 || @ Mets || 6–2 || Ben Rivera (2–2) || Dwight Gooden (6–10) || None || 20,831 || 48–67
|- style="background:#bfb"
| 116 || August 15 || @ Mets || 4–3 || Mike Hartley (5–4) || Jeff Innis (5–8) || Mitch Williams (22) || 15,901 || 49–67
|- style="background:#bbb"
| – || August 16 || @ Mets || colspan=6 | Postponed (rain); Makeup: September 28 as a traditional double-header
|- style="background:#fbb"
| 117 || August 18 (1) || Reds || 0–6 || Greg Swindell (12–5) || Terry Mulholland (11–8) || None || see 2nd game || 49–68
|- style="background:#bfb"
| 118 || August 18 (2) || Reds || 6–1 || Curt Schilling (11–7) || José Rijo (9–9) || None || 27,202 || 50–68
|- style="background:#bfb"
| 119 || August 19 || Reds || 9–3 || Ben Rivera (3–2) || Chris Hammond (6–8) || None || 30,184 || 51–68
|- style="background:#fbb"
| 120 || August 21 || Astros || 1–6 || Brian Williams (5–4) || Andy Ashby (1–1) || None || 20,787 || 51–69
|- style="background:#fbb"
| 121 || August 22 || Astros || 9–14 || Willie Blair (3–6) || Mike Hartley (5–5) || None || 22,345 || 51–70
|- style="background:#fbb"
| 122 || August 23 || Astros || 1–3 || Jimmy Jones (7–5) || Curt Schilling (11–8) || Doug Jones (28) || 27,130 || 51–71
|- style="background:#fbb"
| 123 || August 24 || @ Reds || 5–8 || Chris Hammond (7–8) || Ben Rivera (3–3) || Norm Charlton (25) || 22,946 || 51–72
|- style="background:#fbb"
| 124 || August 25 || @ Reds || 1–7 || Tim Belcher (11–12) || Greg Mathews (0–3) || None || 21,078 || 51–73
|- style="background:#fbb"
| 125 || August 26 || @ Reds || 3–4 || Tom Bolton (3–4) || Andy Ashby (1–2) || Rob Dibble (17) || 23,516 || 51–74
|- style="background:#bfb"
| 126 || August 28 || Braves || 7–3 || Terry Mulholland (12–8) || John Smoltz (14–9) || None || 22,267 || 52–74
|- style="background:#fbb"
| 127 || August 29 || Braves || 6–7 || Charlie Leibrandt (11–5) || Curt Schilling (11–9) || Kent Mercker (6) || 27,760 || 52–75
|- style="background:#bfb"
| 128 || August 30 || Braves || 10–2 || Ben Rivera (4–3) || Tom Glavine (19–5) || None || 32,084 || 53–75
|- style="background:#fbb"
| 129 || August 31 || @ Astros || 2–9 || Butch Henry (5–9) || Andy Ashby (1–3) || None || 5,945 || 53–76
|-

|- style="background:#fbb"
| 130 || September 1 || @ Astros || 3–5 || Brian Williams (7–4) || Cliff Brantley (2–6) || Doug Jones (29) || 6,334 || 53–77
|- style="background:#fbb"
| 131 || September 2 || @ Astros || 2–3 || Pete Harnisch (6–9) || Terry Mulholland (12–9) || Doug Jones (30) || 7,828 || 53–78
|- style="background:#bfb"
| 132 || September 4 || @ Braves || 2–1 || Curt Schilling (12–9) || Tom Glavine (19–6) || Mitch Williams (23) || 40,768 || 54–78
|- style="background:#fbb"
| 133 || September 5 || @ Braves || 5–6 || Jeff Reardon (3–2) || Mitch Williams (3–7) || None || 33,755 || 54–79
|- style="background:#fbb"
| 134 || September 6 || @ Braves || 3–4 || Jeff Reardon (4–2) || Mike Hartley (5–6) || None || 42,097 || 54–80
|- style="background:#fbb"
| 135 || September 7 || Mets || 3–6 || Pete Schourek (5–6) || Terry Mulholland (12–10) || Anthony Young (13) || 14,600 || 54–81
|- style="background:#bfb"
| 136 || September 8 || Mets || 2–1 || Keith Shepherd (1–0) || Dwight Gooden (8–12) || Mitch Williams (24) || 15,856 || 55–81
|- style="background:#bfb"
| 137 || September 9 || Mets || 2–1 || Curt Schilling (13–9) || Sid Fernandez (12–10) || None || 15,525 || 56–81
|- style="background:#bfb"
| 138 || September 11 || Pirates || 5–2 || Ben Rivera (5–3) || Bob Walk (9–5) || Mitch Williams (25) || 20,168 || 57–81
|- style="background:#fbb"
| 139 || September 12 || Pirates || 7–9 || Stan Belinda (6–4) || Mitch Williams (3–8) || None || 22,857 || 57–82
|- style="background:#bfb"
| 140 || September 13 || Pirates || 6–3 || Terry Mulholland (13–10) || Bob Patterson (6–3) || None || 35,842 || 58–82
|- style="background:#bfb"
| 141 || September 14 || Expos || 6–2 || Tommy Greene (3–1) || Brian Barnes (6–6) || Keith Shepherd (1) || 12,130 || 59–82
|- style="background:#fbb"
| 142 || September 15 || Expos || 0–3 || Ken Hill (16–8) || Curt Schilling (13–10) || John Wetteland (34) || 13,799 || 59–83
|- style="background:#fbb"
| 143 || September 16 || @ Cubs || 9–14 || Greg Maddux (18–11) || Ben Rivera (5–4) || None || 11,985 || 59–84
|- style="background:#fbb"
| 144 || September 17 || @ Cubs || 0–3 || Mike Morgan (15–7) || José DeLeón (2–8) || None || 7,743 || 59–85
|- style="background:#fbb"
| 145 || September 18 || @ Pirates || 2–5 (6) || Tim Wakefield (6–1) || Terry Mulholland (13–11) || None || 20,387 || 59–86
|- style="background:#fbb"
| 146 || September 19 || @ Pirates || 0–3 || Doug Drabek (14–10) || Tommy Greene (3–2) || None || 25,497 || 59–87
|- style="background:#fbb"
| 147 || September 20 || @ Pirates || 2–3 (13) || Roger Mason (5–6) || Keith Shepherd (1–1) || None || 21,652 || 59–88
|- style="background:#bfb"
| 148 || September 21 || @ Expos || 9–2 || Ben Rivera (6–4) || Chris Nabholz (10–11) || None || 11,596 || 60–88
|- style="background:#bfb"
| 149 || September 22 || @ Expos || 5–2 || Mike Hartley (6–6) || Kent Bottenfield (0–2) || Mitch Williams (26) || 11,196 || 61–88
|- style="background:#bfb"
| 150 || September 23 || Cubs || 9–3 || Bob Ayrault (1–2) || Jim Bullinger (2–6) || None || 12,609 || 62–88
|- style="background:#bfb"
| 151 || September 24 || Cubs || 3–2 (10) || Mitch Williams (4–8) || Bob Scanlan (3–6) || None || 12,963 || 63–88
|- style="background:#bbb"
| – || September 25 || Cardinals || colspan=6 | Postponed (rain); Makeup: September 27 as a traditional double-header
|- style="background:#bfb"
| 152 || September 26 (1) || Cardinals || 3–1 || Curt Schilling (14–10) || Joe Magrane (1–2) || None || see 2nd game || 64–88
|- style="background:#bfb"
| 153 || September 26 (2) || Cardinals || 10–0 || Ben Rivera (7–4) || Donovan Osborne (10–9) || None || 16,189 || 65–88
|- style="background:#fbb"
| 154 || September 27 (1) || Cardinals || 1–8 || Rhéal Cormier (9–10) || Brad Brink (0–4) || None || see 2nd game || 65–89
|- style="background:#bfb"
| 155 || September 27 (2) || Cardinals || 6–5 || Mike Hartley (7–6) || Bryn Smith (3–2) || Mitch Williams (27) || 20,274 || 66–89
|- style="background:#bfb"
| 156 || September 28 (1) || @ Mets || 7–6 (10) || Mitch Williams (5–8) || Jeff Innis (6–9) || None || see 2nd game || 67–89
|- style="background:#bfb"
| 157 || September 28 (2) || @ Mets || 7–6 || Greg Mathews (1–3) || Joe Vitko (0–1) || Keith Shepherd (2) || 8,915 || 68–89
|- style="background:#bfb"
| 158 || September 29 || @ Mets || 5–3 || Bob Ayrault (2–2) || Anthony Young (2–14) || Mitch Williams (28) || 7,283 || 69–89
|- style="background:#fbb"
| 159 || September 30 || @ Mets || 2–6 || Sid Fernandez (14–11) || Kyle Abbott (1–14) || None || 6,350 || 69–90
|-

|- style="background:#fbb"
| 160 || October 2 || @ Cardinals || 1–2 || Donovan Osborne (11–9) || Curt Schilling (14–11) || Lee Smith (42) || 17,724 || 69–91
|- style="background:#bfb"
| 161 || October 3 || @ Cardinals || 3–2 || Greg Mathews (2–3) || Lee Smith (4–9) || Mitch Williams (29) || 20,311 || 70–91
|- style="background:#fbb"
| 162 || October 4 || @ Cardinals || 3–6 || Rhéal Cormier (10–10) || Tommy Greene' (3–3) || Lee Smith (43) || 32,475 || 70–92
|-

Roster

Player stats

Batting

Starters by positionNote: Pos = Position; G = Games played; AB = At bats; H = Hits; Avg. = Batting average; HR = Home runs; RBI = Runs batted inOther battersNote: G = Games played; AB = At bats; H = Hits; Avg. = Batting average; HR = Home runs; RBI = Runs batted inPitching

Starting pitchersNote: G = Games pitched; IP = Innings pitched; W = Wins; L = Losses; ERA = Earned run average; SO = StrikeoutsOther pitchersNote: G = Games pitched; IP = Innings pitched; W = Wins; L = Losses; ERA = Earned run average; SO = StrikeoutsRelief pitchersNote: G = Games pitched; IP = Innings pitched; W = Wins; L = Losses; ERA = Earned run average; SO = Strikeouts''

Farm system

Notes

References
1992 Philadelphia Phillies season at Baseball Reference

Philadelphia Phillies seasons
Philadelphia Phillies season
Philadelphia Phillies